Thomas Frederic Harrison (1815-1888) was a Liverpool ship-owner who founded the Harrison Shipping Line in the city in the late 1800s.

References

Further reading 
 

1815 births
1888 deaths
19th-century British businesspeople